= Numismatic Essays =

1986 essay collection edited by Wolgang Schneewind

Numismatic Essays by Members of The South African Numismatic Society 1986
- Editor: Wolgang Schneewind
- Subject: Numismatics
- Publisher: South African Numismatic Society
- Publication date: 1986
- Publication place: South Africa
- Pages: 75
- OCLC: 17675065

Numismatic Essays by Members of The South African Numismatic Society 1986 was published by the South African Numismatic Society in 1986. Edited by Wolgang Schneewind, it contains ten essays from member of the society, including then-president Gerald Hoberman.
